Rais Yahya (also romanized as Ra’īs Yaḩyá; also known as Ra’īsī and Ra’īsī Yaḩyá) is a village in Sigar Rural District, in the Central District of Lamerd County, Fars Province, Iran. At the 2006 census, its population was 191, in 39 families.

References 

Populated places in Lamerd County